Kentland may refer to a location in the United States:

Kentland, Indiana, in Newton County
Kentland crater
Kentland Municipal Airport
Kentland, Maryland, in Prince George's County
Kentland Farm Historic and Archeological District near Blacksburg, Virginia

See also
Kent Land District, Tasmania
Kent Land District, Western Australia
Kentlands, a neighborhood of Gaithersburg, Maryland in Montgomery County